Legendary Amazons is a 2011 Chinese film based on the stories of the Yang Clan Generals. The film was directed by Frankie Chan and starred Richie Jen, Cecilia Cheung, Cheng Pei-pei, Liu Xiaoqing and Kathy Chow. The film is based on the same source material as the 1972 Hong Kong film The 14 Amazons.

Plot
The film is set in early 11th century China during the reign of Emperor Renzong of the Song dynasty. The emperor neglects state affairs and indulges in personal pleasures, while the government sinks into corruption and war continues to rage on at the borders of the Song dynasty. The Song dynasty is being invaded by the armies of the rival state of Western Xia.

Yang Zongbao is the last man standing in the Yang clan, a family of generals who have dedicated their lives to defending the Song dynasty from foreign invaders. He apparently dies in battle tragically when the treacherous Imperial Grand Tutor (minister) Pang refuses to send reinforcements to aid him. Yang Zongbao's widowed wife, Mu Guiying, leads the other widows of the Yang clan into battle to continue the legacy of their husbands.

Cast
 Richie Jen as Yang Zongbao
 Cecilia Cheung as Mu Guiying
 Cheng Pei-pei as She Saihua
 Liu Xiaoqing as Chai Qingyun
 Ge Chunyan as Zhou Yunjing
 Oshima Yukari as Zou Lanxiu
 Li Jing as Geng Jinhua
 Jin Qiaoqiao as Dong Yue'e
 Yang Zitong as Meng Jinbang
 Kathy Chow as Ma Saiying
 Yu Na as Huyan Chijin
 Chen Zihan as Yang Yanqi
 Liu Dong as Yang Yanying
 Xiao Mingyu as Yang Wenguang
 Zhou Xiaofei as Yang Paifeng
 Wang Ti as Yang Jinhua
 Zhao Qianyu as Little Bean
 Tang Yaolin as Little Sparrow
 Shi Fanxi as Yin Qi
 Wu Ma as Pang Ji
 Lin Wei as Wang Qiang
 Zhong Chao as Liu Fu
 Li Boyu as Jiao Tinggui
 Luo Yingyuan as Meng Huaiyuan
 Han Yu as Meng Liang
 Hu Biao as Jiao Zan
 Ren Xuehai as Fan Zhongyan
 Xiao Rongsheng as Yang Yanzhao
 Xu Xiao as Di Qing
 Feng Ke'an as Little Bean's grandfather

See also
 Jackie Chan filmography

References

External links
 
 

Films set in 11th-century Song dynasty
Films set in the Western Xia
2011 films
Chinese historical films
Works based on The Generals of the Yang Family
Chinese war drama films
Films about widowhood
Films directed by Frankie Chan
2011 war drama films
2011 drama films
2010s Mandarin-language films